Mirabad-e Abadi (also Romanized as Mīrābād-e ʿAbadī; also known as Mīrābād) is a village in Jahadabad Rural District, in the Central District of Anbarabad County, Kerman Province, Iran. At the 2006 census, its population was 26, in 7 families.

References 

Populated places in Anbarabad County